All My Loving is an EP released by The Beatles in the United Kingdom on 7 February 1964 by Parlophone (catalogue number GEP8891). It is the Beatles' fourth British EP, featuring four tracks (two from their album Please Please Me and two from With The Beatles), and was released only in mono. It was also released in Sweden, Australia and New Zealand.

Track listing

EP sales chart performance

UK
Entry Date : 8 February 1964
Highest Position : 1 (for 8 weeks)
Weeks in Chart : 44 weeks

Australia
Entry Date : 21 March 1964
Highest Position : 1
Weeks in Chart : 29 weeks

References

External links
The Beatles - All My Loving at Graham Calkin's Beatles Pages.

1964 EPs
Albums produced by George Martin
The Beatles EPs
Parlophone EPs